Perth RedStar Football Club is an Australian soccer club from Joondalup, Western Australia currently playing in the National Premier Leagues Western Australia and National Premier Leagues WA Women.

Their home ground is the RedStar Arena at the Joondalup campus of Edith Cowan University.

History
The club was formed in 1992 as Joondalup City Soccer Club and played at the Gumblossom Park in Quinns Rocks. They moved to the Arena Joondalup in 1995 and in their first season in the Semi-pro league finished third in the Professional Soccer Federation of WA third division a great start to top-flight football in the state.

In the first season of the Soccer West Coast Division One, City won promotion to the Premier League as Champions in 1996. Joondalup City's first season in the top flight in 1997 was a moderately successful one, where they finished in a mid-table position and improved to third place in 1998.

In 1999 the club changed its name to ECU Joondalup SC. A successful season saw Paul Simmons' side win the club's first major trophy by taking out the Premier League title, which was their first-ever Premiership after only four seasons in the professional ranks.

Under the guidance of former Perth Glory manager Kenny Lowe, ECU Joondalup SC won their first Championship in 2020 (no Premier was awarded), with striker Danny Hodgson also claiming the season's Golden Boot award with 17 goals.

In February 2022, ECU Joondalup SC and Northern Redbacks WSC announced a merger to create Perth RedStar FC as a new club.

Current men's squad

Current women's squad

Staff
Technical director: Andrew Ord
First-team coach: Callum Salmon
Assistant coach: David Butterfield

Notable past players

List includes players from ECU Joondalup youth or senior teams that have gone on to represent the Australian national team.

 Chris Herd
 Brandon O'Neill
 Josh Risdon
 Adam Taggart
 Rhys Williams
 Ryan Williams

Coaches
 Paul Simmons (1992–2002)
 Stuart Kamaz (2003)
 Paul Simmons (2004)
 Stuart Currie (2005)
 Eric Williams (2005)
 John Brown (2006)
 Willie McNally (2006–2008)
 Syd Amphlett (2008–2011)
 Salv Todaro (2011–2013)
 Dale McCulloch (2013–2019)
 Kenny Lowe (2020–present)

Honours
 2020, 2022 NPL Champions
 1998, 2002 Boral Challenge Cup Winners
 1999 Premier League Winners
 1996 First Division Winners

References

External links
 Official Website

National Premier Leagues clubs
Football West State League teams
Association football clubs established in 1992
1992 establishments in Australia